Arsen Eraliev (born 15 May 1990 in Bishkek) is a Kyrgyzstani Greco-Roman wrestler. He competed in the Greco-Roman 55 kg event at the 2012 Summer Olympics; he was defeated in the 1/8 finals by Hamid Sourian and eliminated in the repechage round by Péter Módos.

References

External links
 

1990 births
Living people
Olympic wrestlers of Kyrgyzstan
Wrestlers at the 2012 Summer Olympics
Wrestlers at the 2016 Summer Olympics
Sportspeople from Bishkek
Kyrgyzstani male sport wrestlers
Asian Wrestling Championships medalists
21st-century Kyrgyzstani people